Gordon Harold Smith (born May 25, 1952) is an American politician, businessman, and academic administrator who served as a United States Senator from the state of Oregon. A Republican, he served two terms in the Senate from 1997 to 2009. On September 18, 2009, he was appointed president of the National Association of Broadcasters (NAB).
, he is the last Republican to represent Oregon in the Senate.

Early life and family
Smith was born in Pendleton, Oregon, to Jessica (Udall) and Milan Dale Smith on May 25, 1952. Smith's family moved to Bethesda, Maryland during his childhood, when his father became an Assistant United States Secretary of Agriculture. He was involved with the Boy Scouts of America and earned the rank of Eagle Scout. Smith is a member of the Church of Jesus Christ of Latter-day Saints (LDS Church).  After graduating from high school, Smith served for two years as an LDS Church missionary in New Zealand.

Smith then went to college at Brigham Young University, received his Juris Doctor from Southwestern University School of Law, and became an attorney in New Mexico and Arizona. He moved back to Oregon in the 1980s to become director of the family owned Smith Frozen Foods company in Weston, Oregon.

Smith and his wife, Sharon, adopted three children in the 1980s, including two sons (Morgan and Garrett) and a daughter (Brittany). On September 8, 2003, Garrett, then a 21-year-old college student majoring in culinary arts, died by suicide. Smith wrote a book entitled Remembering Garrett, One Family’s Battle with a Child’s Depression. In 2004, President George W. Bush signed the Garrett Lee Smith Memorial Act, authorizing $82 million for suicide-prevention and awareness programs at colleges.

Smith is also a member of the Udall political family. His mother was a cousin of the late Representatives Mo Udall (D-AZ) and Stewart Udall (D-AZ), and Smith is a second cousin of Senators Mark Udall (D-CO) and Tom Udall (D-NM). He is a double second cousin of both of them, as their great-grandparents were a pair of brothers and a pair of sisters who married. All three of them were candidates for Senate in the 2008 elections. Smith was the only Republican and incumbent senator of the group, and the only one of the three to lose his electoral bid. Smith's brother, Milan Dale Smith, Jr., is a federal judge appointed by President George W. Bush in 2006. 
Smith is a member of the board of directors of the International Republican Institute.  In 2010, another second cousin, fellow Republican Mike Lee of Utah, was elected to the Senate.

On March 31, 2012, Smith was called as an area seventy in the LDS Church.  He was released from this assignment in August 2022.

Early political career
Smith entered politics with his election to the Oregon State Senate in 1992, and became president of that body in 1995. Later in 1995, he ran in a special election for a Senate seat vacated by the resignation of Bob Packwood, but was narrowly defeated in the January 1996 special election by then-Congressman Ron Wyden. Smith carried all but eight counties, but could not overcome an 89,000-vote deficit in Multnomah County, home to Portland–far exceeding the overall margin of 18,200 votes.

U.S. Senate

Elections 
United States Senator Mark Hatfield, a fellow Republican, announced his retirement later in 1996. Smith became the first person to run for the Senate twice in one year. This time he won, easily defeating Lon Mabon (whose organization, the Oregon Citizens Alliance, had previously endorsed Smith over Wyden) in the Republican primary and Democrat Tom Bruggere in the general election by a close margin.  Before his election, Oregon had not elected a senator from the eastern part of the state since 1938.

Smith was re-elected in 2002, defeating Oregon Secretary of State Bill Bradbury by 57% to 39%.

Smith's approval rating was 52 percent, with 38 percent disapproving.

Political positions
In 1996 Smith was endorsed by the conservative political activist group the Oregon Citizens Alliance in his race against Wyden. After losing that initial race for Packwood's seat, Smith then renounced the OCA endorsement and won in his subsequent race for the seat being vacated by Senator Hatfield.

In October 1999, Smith was one of four Republicans to vote in favor of the Comprehensive Test Ban Treaty. The treaty was designed to ban underground nuclear testing and was the first major international security pact to be defeated in the Senate since the Treaty of Versailles.

Smith is pro-life, and in 2003 he voted in favor of the Partial-Birth Abortion Ban Act, legislation that prohibits the intact dilation and extraction procedure.

In 2006, he voted to pass another controversial bill, this time crossing party lines to vote for the Stem Cell Research Enhancement Act. The measure, which would have expanded federal funding of stem cell research to cell lines extracted from embryos discarded during fertility treatment, became the first bill to be vetoed by President George W. Bush. Smith is one of 19 Senate Republicans who voted for the measure.

In January 2006, Smith began circulating a draft of the Digital Content Protection Act of 2006. The legislation would grant the Federal Communications Commission the authority to authorize a technology known as the broadcast flag. This technology would enable the producers of television programming to ensure the programs cannot be recorded by viewers in their homes, for instance using a digital video recorder or onto recordable DVDs.

Conservatism
Smith is often described as politically moderate, but has strong conservative credentials as well. In a 2007 web video, Smith refers to "the values that make us Republicans, that make us conservatives".

Smith is a member of the moderate Republican Main Street Partnership, and a February 2006 National Journal congressional rating placed Smith in the exact ideological center of the Senate.

However, Smith is described as a moderate Republican by GovTrack.us, and throughout 2006 Smith voted with Republican leader Bill Frist (TN) 82 percent of the time. Based on five senate votes in 2006, the abortion rights advocacy group NARAL gave Smith a score of 15 percent on abortion rights (100 percent being a completely pro-choice score.) For votes cast in 2006, Smith received a 14 percent rating from the League of Conservation Voters (out of a possible 100 percent). Smith's votes have run contrary to widespread public sentiment on several issues, notably minimum wage and the Oregon Death with Dignity Act.

Smith was also a key advocate for embattled conservative Trent Lott's return to a leadership post within the Republican Party in 2006. Lott had resigned his position as Senate Republican Leader in 2002, following controversy surrounding his perceived support of Sen. Strom Thurmond's (R-SC) segregationist politics. After the party lost control of the Senate in November 2006, Republicans elected Lott to the post of Minority Whip (the second-highest Republican position in the Senate.) During the closed-door election, Sen. Judd Gregg (R-NH) nominated Lott for the position. Smith then seconded the nomination and delivered a supportive address before casting his vote.
Lott defeated Sen. Lamar Alexander (R-TN) in a 25 to 24 vote.

War in Iraq
In October 2002, Smith voted in favor of authorizing military force against Iraq, an important step in the run-up to the March 2003 invasion. Smith was one of several Republican Senators for whom political concerns have clashed with party loyalty on the subject of the war in Iraq near an election year.

In December 2006 Smith spoke out against the war for the first time, after having voted in support of it four years prior. Smith said that to continue the current policy in Iraq "may even be criminal".

Several weeks after stating his opposition to the occupation of Iraq, however, Smith declined to sign onto a bipartisan resolution to oppose Bush's plan to escalate troop levels in Iraq by 21,500, prompting questions about the sincerity of his opposition to the continued US military presence in Iraq. Smith cited the controversial nature of the word "escalate" in defending his choice. The bill's sponsors have since changed the word to "increase." Smith expressed support for the bill, but subsequently voted to prevent it from being debated by the full Senate.

In March 2007, Smith was one of only two Republicans to vote for a resolution aimed at withdrawing most American combat troops from Iraq in 2008, the other being Chuck Hagel of Nebraska. The vote was 50 for to 48 against. Smith said in July 2007 that he would vote for a bill authorizing a timeline in which to leave Iraq. He was one of three Republican senators, the other two being Hagel and Olympia Snowe of Maine, to support the Levin Amendment (S.AMDT.2085) to the 2008 Defense Authorization bill (H.R.1585) that would begin a withdrawal of US forces from Iraq. Smith was willing to cross party lines in support of bills for withdrawing troops from Iraq.

In a private meeting with LDS Church leaders in 2009, Smith said that he supported the Iraq War because he "felt the Lord’s hand in it". He told the church leaders that he believed that the introduction of the "rule of law" would help the LDS Church spread into the Middle East.

Gay rights
Smith supported legislation expanding hate crime laws to encompass crimes against gays, and, with Senator Ted Kennedy, introduced such legislation in every Congress. As a result, he was one of a few Republican senators supported by gay rights groups in the United States, including the Human Rights Campaign. Smith also stood up in each Congress to talk about a separate hate crime as an illustration of why improved hate crime legislation was necessary, and had additional crimes published in the Congressional Record each day that Congress was in session.

Gay rights groups have expressed disappointment at Smith's support for the Federal Marriage Amendment in 2004, which would define marriage as between a man and a woman.

Leading up to the 2006 midterm elections, Smith joined Senate Democrats to introduce legislation that would guarantee homosexual employees of the federal government domestic partnership benefits.

Committee assignments
Smith chaired the Special Committee on Aging until Democrats took control of the Senate in 2007.

Smith served on the following Senate committees: Commerce, Science and Transportation, Energy and Natural Resources, Finance, and Indian Affairs.

He was the Ranking Member of the Senate Finance Subcommittee on International Trade and Global Competitiveness.

Electoral history

2002 election

The 2002 Oregon United States Senate election was held on November 5, 2002 and was the first time Smith ran for re-election as senator. Smith easily defeated underfunded Democratic challenger, Oregon Secretary of State Bill Bradbury in the general election.  He carried all but one county in the state, Multnomah County, home to Portland.

2008 election

In Smith's second bid for re-election he faced State House Speaker Jeff Merkley.
Smith earned 40% favorable and 20% unfavorable ratings in a December 2007 poll. Smith's office characterized the relatively low numbers as a reflection on Congress in general; a spokesman for Steve Novick's campaign (Novick lost to Merkley in the primary) suggested that the public was frustrated with elected officials and looking to outsiders to effect change, and Merkley's campaign highlighted Smith's shifts in position on the war in Iraq.
The result was too close to call for almost two days.  Ultimately, Merkley was declared the winner by 49% to 46%, with 5% going to David Brownlow, a Constitution Party candidate.  While Smith carried all but six counties, he could not overcome a 142,000-vote deficit in Multnomah County.

In 2008, Smith's double second cousins, Democrats Tom and Mark Udall (see above), also ran in U.S. Senate elections, in New Mexico and Colorado respectively, and both won their races.

Table 

*Write-in and minor candidate notes: In 1996, Michael L. Hoyes of the Natural Law Party received 4,425 votes and other minor candidates received 1,402 votes.  In 2002, minor candidates received 1,354 votes.  In 2008, minor candidates received 5,388 votes.

Post-Senate career
In the aforementioned private meeting with LDS Church leaders in 2009, Smith shared information he said "may be classified" about Iran's nuclear program. (Smith's spokesman has since stated that none of the information shared was, in fact, classified.) Smith also mentioned instances in which he had pushed officials of various international governments to allow an increased LDS missionary presence in their countries.

Smith was named as president and CEO of the National Association of Broadcasters on September 18, 2009 and began his tenure with the trade association on November 1, 2009. Since then, Smith has led the association's lobbying efforts on Capitol Hill and at the Federal Communications Commission regarding issues affecting the television and radio broadcast industry. These issues include voluntary incentive auctions of broadcast TV spectrum, efforts by record labels to institute a performance fee on local radio stations for music airplay, and retransmission consent rules. Broadcast industry executives have credited Smith's leadership with improving NAB's lobbying clout and influence. In October 2012, Smith was named as one of Washington's top lobbyists by The Hill. He was named Radio Ink‘s Radio Executive Of The Year in 2018.

On March 31, 2012, Smith was called as an area seventy, an ecclesiastical leadership position, in the LDS Church.

Smith has announced his retirement from the NAB, effective January 1, 2022. He will be replaced by NAB’s Chief Operating Officer, Curtis LeGeyt.

See also
 Lee–Hamblin family

References

External links 

 
 
 Collected news and commentary from The New York Times

|-

|-

|-

|-

|-

1952 births
Living people
Presidents of the Oregon State Senate
Republican Party Oregon state senators
20th-century Mormon missionaries
American Mormon missionaries in New Zealand
American leaders of the Church of Jesus Christ of Latter-day Saints
Latter Day Saints from Oregon
Udall family
Brigham Young University alumni
Southwestern Law School alumni
Politicians from Pendleton, Oregon
International Republican Institute
Republican Party United States senators from Oregon
Recipients of the Order of the Cross of Terra Mariana, 1st Class
Area seventies (LDS Church)
21st-century American politicians
People from Bethesda, Maryland
Members of Congress who became lobbyists